Levant is an unincorporated community in Thomas County, Kansas, United States. As of the 2020 census, the population of the community and nearby areas was 68.

History
Levant has a post office with ZIP code 67743. The post office in Levant was established in 1888.

Climate
According to the Köppen Climate Classification system, Levant has a semi-arid climate, abbreviated "BSk" on climate maps.

Demographics

For statistical purposes, the United States Census Bureau has defined Levant as a census-designated place (CDP).

Education
The community is served by Colby USD 315 public school district.

Levant High School was closed through school unification. The Levant High School mascot was Tigers.

References

Further reading

External links
 Thomas County maps: Current, Historic, KDOT

Census-designated places in Thomas County, Kansas
Unincorporated communities in Thomas County, Kansas
Census-designated places in Kansas
Unincorporated communities in Kansas